Zenabel is a 1969 film directed by Ruggero Deodato.

Plot
The film is set in 1627 and is about a young woman named Zenabel (Lucretia Love) who finds out that she is the daughter of a Duke who was killed by the Spanish Baron Imolne. Zenabel gathers a group of women to lead them to fight against Imolne to exact revenge.

Cast

Production
Zenabel was directed by Ruggero Deodato to work again with producer and actor Mauro Parenti, who he had worked with previously on Phenomenal and the Treasure of Tutankhamen. The title role was given to Lucretia Love, Parenti's wife at the time, and Parenti also demanded an acting role for himself, and was given that of the bandit Gennaro. John Ireland played the role of the villain Baron Alfonso Imolde.

The film was shot in Bracciano in Rome and Tuscania. Deodato recalls during a scene in Tuscania's main square where Love's character is about to be burned alive, John Ireland was missing. Ireland was at the Hilton Hotel in Rome waiting for his check as the producer had not paid him yet. When Ireland arrived on set, he refused to give an act in a scene that was to give the signal to light Zenabel aflame. Ireland refused to act not knowing the character's motivation, which led to Deodato giving him a dwarf actor in his arms like a baby to light to signal which pleased Ireland and let him complete the scene.

Release
Zenabel was released in Italy in December 1969. Italian film critic and historian Roberto Curti stated that the film was a "financial disaster" in Italy as it was released during the same week as the Piazza Fontana bombing. Deodato later stated that he put his "heart and soul into Zenabel, but the film was affected by the lack of a popular lead actress."

The film was re-released in France in 1975 under the title La Furie du Desir with hardcore pornography scenes added. These scenes were directed by Claude Mulot.

Reception
In a retrospective overview of Deodato's career, Louis Paul, author of  Italian Horror Film Directors, stated that Zenabel was "Deodato's first film where he exhibits a unique persona as director".

See also
 List of Italian films of 1969
 List of French films of 1969
Ms. Stiletto (1969)

References

Footnotes

Sources

External links
 

Films directed by Ruggero Deodato
Italian historical comedy films
French historical comedy films
Films shot in Rome
Films set in 1627
Films scored by Bruno Nicolai
1960s Italian films
1960s French films
Films about nobility
Italian films about revenge
French films about revenge